Universal English High School Goregaon West is a school in Goregaon West locality of Mumbai, India. The school was founded in 1961 in Goregaon West itself. George P. Oommen and Gracey George were the founders. It is administered and run by Universal Education Trust with Sheila Seth as its principal. The school is affiliated with the Maharashtra State Board of Secondary and Higher Secondary Education.

References

External links 
 

High schools and secondary schools in Mumbai
Educational institutions established in 1961
1961 establishments in Maharashtra